Rakkestad Station is located in Rakkestad, Norway on the Eastern Østfold Line. The station is also served by the Oslo Commuter Rail line R22 from Oslo S with two trains during rush hour. Rakkestad Station was opened in 1882 as part of the eastern section of the Østfold line and is the terminal station for the commuter rail services.

Railway stations in Østfold
Railway stations on the Østfold Line
Railway stations opened in 1882
1882 establishments in Norway
Rakkestad